Aquarius Records is an independent record label based in Montreal, Quebec, Canada.

History
Aquarius Records was founded in 1969.  The first president was Terry Flood and the other founding owners were Donald Tarlton, Bob Lemm, Dan Lazare and Jack Lazare. The label was initially distributed by London Records of Canada.

Among the first acts signed to the label was the Halifax band April Wine, who had also worked with Much Productions. Other artists developed by Aquarius during their first decade included Montreal's Walter Rossi and a rock band from Windsor, Ontario called Teaze. While still with London, Aquarius released records by Mashmakhan, Freedom North, Ross Holloway, Roger Doucet, The Rabble and others.

In 1978 Aquarius Records changed distribution to Capitol-EMI and it was early in this association that April Wine began achieving international success. In the 1980s Aquarius signings included Corey Hart, Sass Jordan, Mindstorm, Sword and Myles Goodwyn and the label also released albums by The Stampeders and The Guess Who. In its first twenty years Aquarius sold over 5 million records in Canada and Aquarius artists sold a similar amount in the rest of the world.

In the 1990s some of Aquarius' efforts were diverted by the launching of a French-language label called Tacca Musique which had success almost immediately with artists like Kevin Parent and France D'Amour. On the English side, Aquarius would release new artists Bif Naked and Serial Joe and also it licensed records by Men Without Hats and Deep Purple. By the end of the 1990s the ownership of Aquarius Records was acquired by Donald Tarlton (Donald K. Donald).

Starting in 2000 Aquarius began expansion through the development of new imprints, including DKD Disques (La Chicane, Danni Bedard) and through joint ventures like Last Gang Records (Metric, Crystal Castles, Mother Mother, Chromeo), Arts & Crafts International (Stars, Amy Millan), Indica Records (Les Trois Accords, Dobacaracol, Priestess), Mensa Music (Adam Gregory), Moving Units (Bless, Platinumberg). The biggest selling new artist on Aquarius was Sum 41, and other artists, including Danko Jones, Jeremy Fisher, Gob and Mark Berube, came to the label. Also during this period, it began a distribution deal with Unidisc Music.

In 2006, Aquarius was one of six labels who resigned from the Canadian Recording Industry Association, complaining that their interests were not being represented.

Notable artists released on Aquarius

 All Systems Go!
 April Wine
 Bif Naked
 Brown Brigade
 Corey Hart
 Deep Purple
 Rich Dodson
 Roger Doucet
 Eleven Thirty (11:30)
 Evermore
 Fat Man Waving
 The Flyers
 Freedom North
 FUBAR (soundtrack)
 Lewis Furey
 Gob
 Goldenhorse
 Myles Goodwyn
 The Guess Who
 Helix

 Hot Springs
 Hollowick
 Hurricane Jane
 Jeremy Fisher
 Jerry Jerry and the Sons of Rhythm Orchestra
 Danko Jones
 Jorane
 Sass Jordan
 JT Soul
 Lindy
 Marble Hall
 Mashmakhan
 McAuley
 Monkey House
 Allan Nicholls
 The Operation M.D.
 Michel Pagliaro
 Pigeon-Hole
 Peter Pringle

 Jodie Resther
 Chad Richardson
 Hollowick (formerly Rides Again)
 Lindsay Robins
 Johnny Rodgers
 Rubberman
 Saints and Sinners
 Stevie Salas
 Serial Joe
 Sharp Edges
 Silver
 Spek
 The Stampeders
 Sword
 Sum 41
 Tchukon
 Teaze
 Winston

See also

 List of record labels

References

External links
 Aquarius Records website
 Aquarius Records on MySpace
 Aquarius Records on PureVolume

 
Record labels established in 1969
Canadian independent record labels
Rock record labels
Companies based in Montreal
Netlabels
Online music stores of Canada